Falanga may refer to:

 3M11 Falanga, an anti-tank missile
 Falanga (torture), a form of torture wherein the soles of the feet are beaten
 National Radical Camp Falanga (1935-1939), a Polish political group
 Falanga (organisation), a Polish political group founded in 2009 by former National Radical Camp member Bartosz Bekier

See also 
 Falange (disambiguation)